Zhitnya is a rural locality (a village) in Pochepsky District, Bryansk Oblast, Russia. The population was 212 as of 2010. There are 2 streets.

Geography 
Zhitnya is located 10.3 km northwest of Pochep (the district's administrative centre) by road. Zhitnya (settlement) is the closest rural locality.

References 

Rural localities in Pochepsky District